Navillera may refer to:

 "Navillera" (song), a 2016 song by GFriend
 Navillera (TV series), a 2021 South Korean TV series

See also
 Nabillera, a 2022 EP by Hyuna
 "Nabillera" (song), the title song